Vitaliy Sachko and Dominic Stricker were the defending champions but chose not to defend their title.

Sadio Doumbia and Fabien Reboul won the title after defeating Marco Bortolotti and Sergio Martos Gornés 6–2, 6–4 in the final.

Seeds

Draw

References

External links
 Main draw

Internazionali di Tennis Città di Perugia - Doubles
2022 Doubles